Azo of Bologna or Azzo or Azolenus ( 1150–1230) was an influential Italian jurist and a member of the school of the so-called glossators. Born circa 1150 in Bologna, Azo studied under Joannes Bassianus and became professor of civil law at Bologna. He is sometimes known as Azo Soldanus, from his father's surname, and also Azzo Porcius (dei Porci), to distinguish him from later famous Italians named Azzo. He died circa 1230.

Azo wrote glosses on all parts of the Corpus Iuris Civilis. His most influential work is his Summa Codicis, a commentary of the civil law organized according to the order of Justinian's Code. As one of the very few medieval legal texts in Latin, the Summa Codicis has been translated into Old French.

Azo's works enjoyed great authority among generations of continental lawyers, such that it used to be said, roughly translated: "Who hasn't Azo on his side, will not go to court," neither as a plaintiff nor as judge. Azo's Summa Codicis, was also used (and often copied verbatim) by Henry Bracton in his account of English law. Azo's many glosses were ultimately incorporated into the Great Gloss of his pupil, Accursius.

Works 

 Summa codicis
 Lectura
 
 Glossae
 Brocarda

See also 
 Codex Justinianeus

References

Further reading

External links
 
 Works of Azo of Bologna at ParalipomenaIuris

12th-century Italian jurists
12th-century Latin writers
13th-century Italian jurists